Irby is an unincorporated community in southern Lincoln County, Washington, United States, west of Odessa, north of State Route 28 on Irby Road. The BNSF Railway runs through the town. It was founded as a ranch in 1878 by John Irby. A post office called Irby was established in 1907, and remained in operation until 1962.

Geography
Irby is located on Crab Creek.

References

External links
Washington State Department of Ecology water quality monitoring station 43A070: Crab Creek at Irby

Unincorporated communities in Washington (state)
Unincorporated communities in Lincoln County, Washington